Givira circumpunctata is a moth in the family Cossidae. It is found in Guyana.

References

Natural History Museum Lepidoptera generic names catalog

Moths described in 1916
Givira